Cudham is a village in Greater London, England, located within the London Borough of Bromley and beyond London's urban sprawl. It is located on the Greater London border with Kent, bordering the Sevenoaks District. Cudham lies south of Orpington and north west of Sevenoaks.

History
Cudham church, dedicated to St Peter and St Paul, is mentioned in the Domesday Book. 

Lord Simon de Manning, a former Lord of the Manor for Kevington, London, and holder of the land which now includes Cudham,  was a Grandson of Rudolph de Manning, Count Palatine, (who, married Elgida, aunt to King Harold I, (Harold Harefoot), of England); he was the royal Standard Bearer to King Richard the Lionheart, who carried the royal Standard to Jerusalem in 1190, during the First Crusade. In England, the forms Earl Palatine and Palatine Earldom are preferred.

The Blacksmith's Arms, originally a 17th-century farmhouse, has memorabilia relating to the music hall artiste known as "Little Tich". Cudham was part of Bromley Rural District from 1894 and Orpington Urban District from 1934 to 1965. The village was therefore part of Kent (and therefore administered by Kent County Council) until the creation of Greater London on 1 April 1965. Cudham Recreation Ground, behind the church and pub, is home to Cudham Wyse Cricket Club, which was formed in 1965.

Transport
Cudham, being in the county of Greater London, is still under the Transport for London remit and is served by a London Buses bus service, with the R5/R10 connecting the area with Orpington via Green Street Green, and also to Knockholt in Kent. The closest rail links to the area are Chelsfield station and Knockholt station, in Travelcard Zone 6.

Events
Cudham hosts one of the oldest village shows and fetes, dating back to Victorian times. It is held annually on the August Bank Holiday Monday.

Cudham also hosts the famous annual Cudham Craic music festival, a popular two day music event in Cudham's recreation ground promoted by KentBand.com.

Local politics

Cudham is part of the largest ward in Greater London, Darwin (ward), covering a rural area including Downe, Leaves Green, Berry's Green, Single Street, and Westerham Hill.

Since 2019, the local Member of Parliament is Gareth Bacon, elected with 30,882 votes or  63.4% of the vote share. Previously, the local Member of Parliament has been Jo Johnson of the Conservatives who is brother of the Prime Minister, Boris Johnson. Johnson served as Minister for Transport and Minister for London up until his resignation in November 2018. He did so in order to support a People's Vote on the final Brexit deal. In July 2019, he was subsequently reinstated in his ministerial role as Minister for Universities before resigning in September 2019 and announced that he would stand down as an MP at the next United Kingdom general election.

By a numerical majority of 22,378 votes (45.9%), Orpington is the safest Conservative Parliamentary seat in London.

One councillor is elected every four years to Bromley London Borough Council. To date, the Darwin ward has only been represented by representatives from the Conservative Party.

References

External links

Church history
Cudham Wyse Cricket Club

Villages in the London Borough of Bromley
Districts of the London Borough of Bromley
Former civil parishes in the London Borough of Bromley